Nong Bua Daeng is a district (amphoe) of Chaiyaphum province, northeastern Thailand.

History
The district was established as a minor district (king amphoe) on 16 July 1965, when the two tambons Nong Bua Daeng and Nang Daet were split off from Kaset Sombun District. It was upgraded to a full district on 1 April 1969.

Geography
Neighbouring districts are (from the north clockwise): Khon San district, Kaset Sombun, Mueang Chaiyaphum, Ban Khwao, Nong Bua Rawe, and Phakdi Chumphon of Chaiyaphum Province; and Nong Phai and Mueang Phetchabun of Phetchabun province.

Administration
The district is divided into eight subdistricts (tambons), which are further subdivided into 130 villages (mubans). There is one municipality (thesaban), and eight tambon administrative organizations (TAO).

Missing numbers are now tambons of Phakdi Chumphon District.

References

External links
amphoe.com

Nong Bua Daeng